Adralestos was the Domestic of the Schools (commander-in-chief of the Byzantine army) in the early years of Romanos I Lekapenos' reign.

Very little is known about him. He was apparently appointed to the post of Domestic after Romanos I's rise to the throne in 920, in succession to John Garidas, and held the post until his death later in 920 or in 921, as he is already mentioned as having died in 921. His successor was Pothos Argyros. His family is unknown. Rodolphe Guilland considered him an ancestor, likely grandfather, of Adralestos Diogenes, strategos of the Anatolic Theme in 970, but there is little concrete evidence to support this assumption other than the identical names.

References

Sources
 
 

920s deaths
Year of birth unknown
Year of death uncertain
10th-century Byzantine people
Domestics of the Schools